The Puerto Rico women's national handball team represents Puerto Rico in international handball competitions.

Results

World Championship

Pan American Championship

Pan American Games

Central American and Caribbean Games

Nor.Ca. Championship

Caribbean Handball Cup
2013 – 3rd

Team

Current squad
Squad for the 2021 World Women's Handball Championship.

Head coach: Camilo Estevez

Technical staff
 Head coach: Camilo Estévez
 Assistant coach: Dennis Santiago

References

External links

IHF profile

Handball
Women's national handball teams
National team